Ronaldo Moraes da Silva (born 2 March 1962), known as Ronaldo Moraes, is a Brazilian former footballer who played as a defender. He competed in the 1984 Summer Olympics with the Brazil national football team.

References

External links
 Ronaldo Moraes at ZeroZero (in Portuguese)

1962 births
Living people
Footballers from São Paulo
Association football defenders
Brazilian footballers
Brazilian expatriate footballers
Brazil international footballers
Olympic footballers of Brazil
Footballers at the 1984 Summer Olympics
Olympic silver medalists for Brazil
Olympic medalists in football
Sport Club Corinthians Paulista players
Operário Ferroviário Esporte Clube players
Grêmio Foot-Ball Porto Alegrense players
Goiás Esporte Clube players
Esporte Clube Santo André players
Botafogo Futebol Clube (SP) players
Coquimbo Unido footballers
Club Deportivo Palestino footballers
Campeonato Brasileiro Série A players
Campeonato Brasileiro Série B players
Chilean Primera División players
Brazilian expatriate sportspeople in Chile
Expatriate footballers in Chile
Medalists at the 1984 Summer Olympics